Cavil may refer to:

 John Cavil, a fictional character from the re-imagined Battlestar Galactica television series
 Kwame Cavil (born 1979), Canadian Football League wide receiver